De Lutte is a village in the Dutch province of Overijssel. It is located in the municipality of Losser. It is located close to the border between the Netherlands and Germany. De Lutte is connected to Germany (to the east) and Oldenzaal and Hengelo (to the west) by the A1.

The Landhuishotel Bloemenbeek with its Michelin-starred restaurant De Bloemenbeek is located in the village.

The Losser (De Lutte) Roman Catholic Churchyard contains the graves of five Second World War soldiers who served with the Royal Air Force. Three of the deceased soldiers served with the United Kingdom while the remaining two served with Australia. The graves are for sergeant Sydney Hennan, sergeant William Leonard Wykes, flight sergeant Conrad George Johnston, sergeant John Fisher Morgan and flight sergeant John Kevin Thompson.

Gallery

References

Populated places in Overijssel
Losser